The 1937–38 Challenge Cup was the 38th staging of rugby league's oldest knockout competition, the Challenge Cup.

The final was contested by Salford and Barrow at Wembley in front of a crowd of 51,243. Salford won the match 7–4.

The trophy was presented by Australian Test cricketer Don Bradman.

First round

Second round

Quarterfinals

Semifinals

Final

Notes

References

External links
 
 Challenge Cup official website 
 Challenge Cup 1937/38 results at Rugby League Project

Challenge Cup
Challenge Cup